Nikola Jovanović (Cyrillic: Никола Joвaнoвић; born 18 September 1952) is a retired Montenegrin footballer. Representing Yugoslavia during his career, he is known for being first player from outside the British Isles to join Manchester United. He is now a sports director of FK Budućnost Podgorica.

Club career
Jovanović was one of the most successful players of, then Yugoslav, giant Red Star where he played as a defender and had an impressive overall record of 359 matches and 50 goals for the Belgrade side. He then made history when he became the first Yugoslav footballer to play for leading English league side Manchester United, where he made 21 Football League appearances in the early 1980s after being signed by manager Dave Sexton. In addition, he was the first non-British Isles player to be signed by the club — Italian-born Carlo Sartori, who played for United during the 1960s and 1970s, moved to Manchester as a child and came through the club's youth system. Before signing for Manchester United he turned down an offer from Bayern Munich and decided in favour of the English side. In January 1980, Manchester United made Jovanović one of the club's most expensively signed players at the time by paying £300,000 for his services to Red Star (it was Red Star's and Yugoslav First League record transfer fee at the time). However, his time at Old Trafford was short lived and he failed to justify his transfer fee. By the end of his first season he began suffering from chronic back pain and before long was on his way back to his native Yugoslavia. After being injured for almost two seasons he retired at the age of 31.
Before he returned to Yugoslavia, he went to Hong Kong joined Sea Bees football team from quarter 4 1982 to February 1983.

International career 
Jovanović made his debut for Yugoslavia in an April 1979 European Championship qualification away against Cyprus and has earned a total of 7 caps, scoring no goals. He was part of the squad at the 1982 FIFA World Cup and his final international was a June 1982 World Cup match against Honduras in Zaragoza.

Personal life 
Born in Cetinje, present day Montenegro, he resides with his family in Mengeš, Slovenia. He has worked as sports director at Slovenian club NK Domžale and was offered jobs as Montenegrin national team coach and as sports director at former club Budućnost. He took up the latter role in summer 2013.

References

External links

  Serbian national football team website

1952 births
Living people
Sportspeople from Cetinje
Yugoslav footballers
Montenegrin footballers
Association football defenders
FK Budućnost Podgorica players
Red Star Belgrade footballers
Manchester United F.C. players
Yugoslav First League players
English Football League players
Yugoslavia international footballers
1982 FIFA World Cup players
Yugoslav expatriate footballers
Yugoslav expatriate sportspeople in England
Expatriate footballers in England
Serbia and Montenegro expatriate sportspeople in Slovenia
Montenegrin expatriate sportspeople in Slovenia